Eugen Roth (January 24, 1895 – April 28, 1976) was a Bavarian poet who wrote mostly humorous verse.

Roth was born in Munich, the son of the well-known Munich writer Hermann Roth.  He volunteered for service in the First World War and was severely wounded.  He studied history, art history, and philosophy and in 1922 he earned his doctorate degree.  From 1927 to 1933, he was the editor of the Münchner Neuesten Nachrichten (Newest Munich News).  Especially beloved were his humorous poems. He died in Munich, aged 81.

Selected works 

 Ein Mensch (Humans) (1935)
 Eugen Roths Tierleben (Eugen Roth's Animal life) (1948)
 Heitere Kneipp-Fibel (Kneipp's Humorous Booklet) (1954)
 Humorapotheke (Humor-pharmacy) (1956 - 1959)
 Das Eugen-Roth-Buch (The Eugen Roth Book) (1966)
 Der Wunderdoktor-Heitere Verse (The Miracle Doctor's Humorous Verses) (1939)

Awards 
 Munich art prize for literature (1952)

External links
 
  Biography
  Selected works

1895 births
1976 deaths
Musicians from Munich
Commanders Crosses of the Order of Merit of the Federal Republic of Germany
German male writers
German Army personnel of World War I